Simon de Hale (died after 1240) was a trusted and long-serving Crown official in the reign of King Henry III of England. He served as the Sheriff of two English counties, and as an itinerant justice  in both England and Ireland.

He was probably born in Hale, Northhamptonshire, and inherited land at Earls Barton in the same county from his cousin John de Buketon in about 1218: the King as a mark of favour gave him twelve royal oaks to build a house at Barton. He also held extensive lands in Yorkshire.

He served as Sheriff of Yorkshire for several years in the early 1220s, and as Sheriff of Wiltshire in 1226. He clearly discharged his duties efficiently, and from 1225 Simon was regularly chosen, along with Sir Richard Duket, who also later served in Ireland, to act as an itinerant justice, with a salary of twenty marks a year. His  circuit eventually extended over most of Eastern England. He may also have sat as a royal judge at Westminster, and appears to have enjoyed seniority. Unlike many judges of the time he may have been a professional lawyer. He was a tax assessor in two counties in 1227. The following year he was sent to Ireland to act as a justice itinerant, but does not seem to have served in Ireland for long. He returned to England, but his name seems to disappear from the records until 1240, when he was once more acting as a justice in Yorkshire. His date of death is not recorded.

Irish judges
High Sheriffs of Yorkshire
High Sheriffs of Wiltshire

Sources
Ball, F. Elrington The Judges in Ireland 1221-1921 London John Murray 1926
Foss, Edward The Judges of England London Longman Brown Green and Longmans 1848

Footnotes